Terra Costa Howard is the Illinois State Representative for the 48th district. She was first elected to the position in 2018. The 48th district includes all or parts of Glen Ellyn, Lisle, Lombard, Wheaton, and Villa Park.

Electoral career
Prior to her election to the Illinois House of Representatives, Costa Howard was a member of the Glen Ellyn School District 41 Board of Education and the Glen Ellyn Plan Commission.

Costa Howard defeated incumbent and House Republican Floor Leader Peter Breen in the 2018 general election. She defeated Breen again in the 2020 general election.

Illinois House of Representatives

Committees
As of 2022, Costa Howard serves on the following committees and subcommittees:
Adoption and Child Welfare (Vice-Chairperson) 
Appropriations - Higher Education Committee
Appropriations-Elementary & Secondary Education Committee
Appropriations-Human Services Committee
Judiciary - Civil Committee
Mental Health & Addiction Committee
Tourism Committee
Transportation: Vehicles & Safety Committee
Special Issues (AP) Subcommittee
Family Law & Probate Subcommittee (Sub-Chairperson)

Legislation
Several pieces of legislation introduced by Costa Howard in the Illinois House of Representatives have gone on to become law in Illinois. HB12, of which she was the Primary Sponsor, allowed employees of a school district, public university, or community college district who had been employed for at least 12 months and who has worked at least 1,000 hours in the previous 12-month period to be eligible for family and medical leave under the same terms and conditions provided to eligible employees under the federal Family and Medical Leave Act of 1993. This legislation was passed in the midst of the COVID-19 pandemic.

Personal life
Costa Howard was born and raised in DuPage County, where she now resides with her spouse and their three daughters.

Costa Howard is an attorney by trade. She attended University of Illinois at Urbana–Champaign and DePaul University College of Law. She is also a Girl Scout leader, an adjunct professor at the College of DuPage, and a member of the Parent Teacher Association.

Electoral history

References

External links
 Campaign website

Living people
Year of birth missing (living people)
21st-century American politicians
21st-century American women politicians
DePaul University College of Law alumni
Illinois lawyers
Democratic Party members of the Illinois House of Representatives
People from Glen Ellyn, Illinois
School board members in Illinois
University of Illinois Urbana-Champaign alumni
Women state legislators in Illinois